Paula Brown is an American politician. She is a Democratic member of the Missouri House of Representatives. Her first election to the house was in 2018, from district 70, and after redistricting in 2022, she was reelected from district 87. She is a retired school teacher from the Hazelwood School District. She is a member of North County Labor, West County Democrats, Chesterfield Democrats and MNEA Retired.

Education 
Brown earned a bachelor’s degree in Elementary Education from the University of Missouri and a master's degree in Education from Lindenwood University.

Electoral history

References 

Democratic Party members of the Missouri House of Representatives
Living people
Year of birth missing (living people)
Women state legislators in Missouri
21st-century American women